Marinus Kok (8 February 1916 - 31 July 1999) was a Dutch priest who served as the twentieth Archbishop of Utrecht from 1970 to 1982. 

After studying at the Old Catholic Seminary i Amersfoort, Netherlands, he was ordained to the diaconate and priesthood in 1941. Kok served as a parish priest in Arnhem, Amersfoort and The Hague, while he served on the faculty of the Old Catholic Seminary in Amersfoort. He became a member of the Chapter of Utrecht in 1967, and rector of the seminary in Amersfoort in 1968. Kok was chosen in 1969 as coadjutor to Andreas Rinkel, the Archbishop of Utrecht. After Rinkel retired on November 8, 1970, he consecrated Kok on November 9, 1970. Kok retired as Archbishop of Utrecht on December 31, 1981.

Kok was married to Topy Smits (1914-2009). On July 31, 1999, he died at a hospital in Zeist at the age of 83.

References

Sources 

1916 births
1999 deaths
20th-century archbishops
Dutch Old Catholic bishops
People from Leiden